A sphere of influence (SOI) in astrodynamics and astronomy is the oblate-spheroid-shaped region around a celestial body where the primary gravitational influence on an orbiting object is that body. This is usually used to describe the areas in the Solar System where planets dominate the orbits of surrounding objects such as moons, despite the presence of the much more massive but distant Sun. In the patched conic approximation, used in estimating the trajectories of bodies moving between the neighbourhoods of different masses using a two body approximation, ellipses and hyperbolae, the SOI is taken as the boundary where the trajectory switches which mass field it is influenced by.

The general equation describing the radius of the sphere  of a planet:

where
  is the semimajor axis of the smaller object's (usually a planet's) orbit around the larger body (usually the Sun).

In the patched conic approximation, once an object leaves the planet's SOI, the primary/only gravitational influence is the Sun (until the object enters another body's SOI). Because the definition of rSOI relies on the presence of the Sun and a planet, the term is only applicable in a three-body or greater system and requires the mass of the primary body to be much greater than the mass of the secondary body. This changes the three-body problem into a restricted two-body problem.

Table of selected SOI radii

The table shows the values of the sphere of gravity of the bodies of the solar system in relation to the Sun (with the exception of the Moon which is reported relative to Earth):

An important understanding to be drawn from the above table is that "Sphere of Influence" here is "Primary". For example, though Jupiter is much larger in mass than say, Neptune, its Primary SOI is much smaller due to Jupiter's much closer proximity to the Sun.

Increased accuracy on the SOI
The Sphere of influence is, in fact, not quite a sphere. The distance to the SOI depends on the angular distance  from the massive body. A more accurate formula is given by

Averaging over all possible directions we get:

Derivation
The distance  separates the two objects.

Due to their gravitational interactions, point  is attracted to point  with acceleration , this frame is therefore non-inertial. To quantify the effects of the perturbations in this frame, one should consider the ratio of the perturbations to the main body gravity i.e. . The perturbation  is also known as the tidal forces due to body .

The frame to choose is the one that has the smallest perturbation ratio. The surface for which  separates the two regions of influence. In general this region is rather complicated but in the case that one mass dominates the other, say , it is possible to approximate the separating surface.

The distance to the sphere of influence must thus satisfy  and so  is the radius of the sphere of influence of body

See also
 Hill sphere
 Sphere of influence (black hole)

References

General references

External links 
Project Pluto

Astrodynamics
Orbits